Blatnica is a settlement in the Bosnia and Herzegovina, Federacija Bosne i Hercegovine entity, Zenica Municipality.

Before the War in Bosnia and Herzegovina, the village was entirely part of the Teslić Municipality; After the war ended, its territory was partially attached to the municipality of Zenica, integrated into the Federation of Bosnia and Herzegovina.

Population

Census of 1991

Population 1997 - 1991

See also 

 Municipalities in Bosnia and Herzegovina

References

External links
  Maplandia

Populated places in Zenica
Populated places in Teslić
Serb communities in the Federation of Bosnia and Herzegovina